Robert Boughey (born 1936) is an American architect born in Pennsylvania, United States. He completed his Bachelor of Architecture from Pratt Institute, Brooklyn, New York in 1959 and received Diploma in Tropical Studies from AA School of Architecture, London in 1967. He is a former research professor of architecture at Pratt institute.

Notable works
 National Museum of Bangladesh, Dhaka
 Kamalapur Railway Station, Dhaka, 1961–64
 Bangladesh University of Engineering and Technology (BUET), Dhaka
 Shaheed Suhrawardi Hall
 Sher-e-Bangla Hall
 Titumir Hall, 1962-1964
 Gymnasium, 1964
 Academic Building, Department of Civil Engineering, 1965
 Priests and Seminarians Residence, Notre Dame College, Dhaka, 1963-1964
 Saint Joseph Higher Secondary School, Dhaka, 1963-1964
 Holy Family Hospital's sisters' Hostel, Dhaka, 1963-1965
 Indoor Stadium Huamark, Bangkok, 1965–66
 Don Mueang International Airport Domestic Terminal, Bangkok, 1982
 Bank of America, Bangkok
 Diethelm Towers, Bangkok
 SCB Park Plaza, Bangkok
 The Boughey Residence, Bangkok
 Bangkok Art and Culture Centre, Bangkok

References

Further reading

Living people
Fellows of the American Institute of Architects
Modernist architects
20th-century American architects
21st-century American architects
Pratt Institute alumni
1940 births
Expatriate architects in Thailand
American expatriates in Thailand